Thomas Miles Sexton (1879 – 11 July 1946) was a Labour Party politician in England.

Sexton studied for some time at Durham University, before becoming a teacher. From 1909, he was the headteacher at Stanhope County School.  He joined the Labour Party, and was elected at the 1935 general election as Member of Parliament for Barnard Castle.  He held the seat until he stood down at the 1945 election, and he died the following year. He died the following year, aged 67.

References

External links 
 

1879 births
1946 deaths
Labour Party (UK) MPs for English constituencies
UK MPs 1935–1945
People from Stanhope, County Durham
Alumni of the College of the Venerable Bede, Durham